Sir William Augustus Cunynghame of Livingstone, 4th Baronet of Milncraig  (1747–1828) was a Scottish politician who sat in the House of Commons of Great Britain from 1774 to 1790.

Early life
Cunynghame was the only surviving son of  Sir David Cunynghame, 3rd Baronet and his wife Lady Mary Montgomerie, daughter of Alexander Montgomerie, 9th Earl of Eglinton, and was born on 19 April 1747. He matriculated at Christ Church, Oxford on 6 December 1766. After he succeeded his father in the baronetcy on 10 October 1767, he undertook a Grand Tour.  His first wife was  Frances Myreton daughter of Sir Robert Myreton, 2nd Baronet whom he married on 21 October 1768. She died on 14 November 1771, and he went abroad for three years to  Italy, Paris and Vienna.

Political career

At the  1774 general election Cunynghame was returned as Member of Parliament for Linlithgowshire  with the agreement of the Hopetoun interest. In June 1779 he was appointed Clerk of the Green Cloth and held the post until March 1782. He was returned again as MP for Linlithgowshire in  1780 and 1784.  He made a second marriage to Mary Udney, daughter of Robert Udney of Udney, Aberdeen on  22 June 1785. In parliament and outside he campaigned strongly for Scottish interests. He was defeated in the 1790 general election and did not re-enter Parliament

Later life and legacy
Cunynghame was receiver of the land tax in Scotland from June 1806 to March 1807. He died on 17 January 1828 and was succeeded by his son David. He had two other sons by his first wife and four sons and three daughters by his second wife. He is buried in the western extension of Greyfriars Kirkyard in central Edinburgh.

References

1747 births
1828 deaths
British MPs 1774–1780
British MPs 1780–1784
British MPs 1784–1790
Members of the Parliament of Great Britain for Scottish constituencies
Baronets in the Baronetage of Nova Scotia
Alumni of Christ Church, Oxford
Place of birth missing